Boinali Saïd Toumbou (born 25 September 1960 in Dzaoudzi, Mayotte) is a French politician who was elected to the French National Assembly on 17 June 2012, representing the 1st constituency of the department of Mayotte. He is a former trade union leader. He stood down at the 2017 legislative election.

References

Mayotte politicians
1960 births
Living people
French people of Comorian descent
Black French politicians
Deputies of the 14th National Assembly of the French Fifth Republic
People from Mayotte
Deputies from Mayotte

See also 

 List of deputies of the 14th National Assembly of France